This article lists the squads of the women's hockey competition at the 2018 Commonwealth Games held in Gold Coast, Australia from 5 to 14 April 2018.

Pool A

England
The squad was announced on 15 March 2018.

Head coach: Daniel Kerry

India
The squad was announced on 14 March 2018.

Head coach: Harendra Singh

Malaysia
Head coach: Dharma Raj Kanniah

South Africa
The squad was announced on 30 January 2018.

Head coach: Sheldon Rostron

Wales
The squad was announced on 1 March 2018.

Head coach: Kevin Johnson

Pool B

Australia
The squad was announced on 16 March 2018.

Head coach: Paul Gaudoin

Canada
The squad was announced on 18 March 2018.

Head coach:  Giles Bonnet

Ghana
Head coach: Emmanuel Ahadjie

New Zealand
The squad was announced on 12 March 2018.

Head coach:  Mark Hager

Scotland
The squad was announced on 14 February 2018.

Head coach: Gordon Shepherd

References

External links
Official Website

squads
2018 in women's field hockey